Andrew W. Troelsen is currently a technology manager at Thomson Reuters in the Enterprise Content Platform (ECP - Big Data) division.  He is an author of several books in the Microsoft technology space including books on Microsoft (D)COM, ATL, .NET, C#, VB (4.0 - modern) and COM & .NET Interoperability. His latest edition of his C# book covers the .NET Core platform and each C# 7.0 update. He has over 18 years experience authoring software development (3-5 day) workshops for engineers on MS platform technologies.

Books 
 Pro C# With the .Net 3.0 Extensions
 Pro C# 3.0 and the .Net 3.5 Framework
 Pro VB 2005 and the .NET 2.0 Platform, Second Edition
 Pro VB 2008 and the .NET 3.5 Platform, Third Edition
 Pro VB 2010 and the .NET 4 Platform (co-written with Vidya Vrat Agarwal)
 Pro C# 2005 and the .Net 2.0 Platform, Third Edition
 Pro C# 2008 and the .NET 3.5 Platform, Fourth Edition
 Pro C# 2010 and the .NET 4 Platform, Fifth Edition
 Pro C# 5.0 and the .NET 4.5 Framework Sixth Edition
 C# 6.0 and the .NET 4.6 Framework Seventh Edition
 Exploring .Net (with Jason Bock)
 Com and .Net Interoperability
 Expert Asp.net 2.0: Advanced Application Design (with many others)
 Developer's Workshop to Com and Atl 3.0
 Visual Basic .Net and the .Net Platform: An Advanced Guide
 Pro Vb With the .net 3.0 Extensions
 C# and the .Net Platform

References 

 http https://www.linkedin.com/in/awtroelsen/

Computer programmers
Living people
Year of birth missing (living people)